An election to the Carmarthenshire County Council was held in March 1937. It was preceded by the 1934 election. Due to the Second World War no elections were held in 1940 and 1943 therefore the 1937 election was followed by the 1946 election.

Overview of the result

As in all previous inter-war elections, the Independent group won a majority of the seats and this majority was bolstered by holding the majority of the aldermanic seats also. By 1937 the Labour Party held almost all the seats in the industrial eastern part of the county.

Boundary changes

There were a number of boundary changes at this election. In Carmarthen town the boundaries were redrawn, reducing the number of wards from four to three. In Llanelli, in contrast, the number of wards were increased from eight to nine following a similar process. An additional ward was also created in Ammanford and new wards at Pontyberem and Trimsaran.

Other wards were renamed or had their boundaries slightly altered.

Unopposed returns

Around half the wards were uncontested, mainly in the rural areas.

Contested elections

A similar number of contests took place compared with 1934. This included contests in rural areas between rival Independent candidates.

Summary of results

53 councillors were elected.

Ward results

Abergwili

Ammanford No.1
Boundary Change.

Ammanford No.2
Boundary Change.

Berwick

Burry Port
Boundary Change.

Caio

Carmarthen Division 1

Carmarthen Division 2

Carmarthen Division 3

Cenarth

Cilycwm

Conwil

Cwmamman

Hengoed

Kidwelly

Laugharne

Llanarthney

Llanboidy

Llandebie North

Llandebie South

Llandilo Rural

Llandilo Urban

Llandovery

Llandyssilio

Llanedy

Llanegwad

Llanelly Division.1
Boundary Change

Llanelly Division 2
Boundary Change

Llanelly Division 3
Boundary Change

Llanelly Division 4
Boundary Change

Llanelly Division 5
Boundary Change

Llanelly Division 6
Boundary Change

Llanelly Division 7
Boundary Change

Llanelly Division 8
Boundary Change

Llanelly Division 9
Boundary Change

Llanfihangel Aberbythick

Llanfihangel-ar-Arth

Llangadock

Llangeler

Llangendeirne

Llangennech

Llangunnor

Llanon

Llansawel

Llanstephan

Llanybyther

Myddfai

Pembrey
Boundary Change

Pontyberem
Boundary Change

Quarter Bach

Rhydcymmerai

St Clears

St Ishmael

Trelech

Trimsaran
Boundary Change

Westfa and Glyn

Whitland

Election of aldermen

In addition to the 53 councillors the council consisted of 17 county aldermen. Aldermen were elected by the council, and served a six-year term. Following the elections the following nine aldermen were elected (with the number of votes in each case).

References

Carmarthenshire County Council elections
1937 Welsh local elections